Kopil Bora is an Assamese actor, anchor and All India Radio voice artist. He debuted in Bidyut Chakravarty's 2002 Assamese film Gun Gun Gane Gane and known for his performance in Mon (2002), Ahir Bhairav (2008), Jetuka Pator Dore (2011) and Dwaar (2013).

Early life
Kopil Bora was born on 30 March. He went to high school at Don Bosco High School, Guwahati and later attended college at Cotton College, Guwahati. He currently lives in Guwahati.

Career

Feature films
Kopil has acted in a host of Assamese films. He debuted in Bidyut Chakravarty's Gun Gun Gane Gane, released in 2002. Later in the same year, his other film Mon got released along with his first Bengali film in the same name, which was released in 2003. His other film credit includes Bidhata (2003), Kadambari, Ahir Bhairav (2008), Jeevan Baator Logori (2009), Jetuka Pator Dore (2011), Dwaar (2013), Raag: The Rhythm of Love (2014) etc. Critics praised his acting in 2013 film Dwaar. In that film, he portrayed a mentally unstable character older to his actual age, named Dwijen Bhattacharya.

Stage and television 

Kopil Bora has acted in many plays. One of the notable ones is Narakor Gopan Kakhyat with Zerifa Wahid, staged in Rabindra Bhawan, Guwahati. It was an adaptation of the French play "In Camera" by Jean-Paul Sartre. In another play with Zerifa Wahid, Pancharatna, staged in Rabindra Bhawan, he played a bold theme of gay boy troubled by his alternate sexuality. He was also associate director of a play called Agnibristi where he plays the lead role too, under Zerifa Wahid's production, staged in Rabindra Bhawan. It was an adaptation of Girish Karnad's play The Fire and the Rain.

In television, He acted in an eight-episode Hindi mini-series titled Manushi (with seven stories by Sahitya Akademi award winner Sneha Devi), directed by Sanjib Hazarika for Doordarshan. His other television credit includes Niyoror Phool on News Live. He also hosted a spelling contest for children on Rang.

Mobile theatre 
He debuted in Assam's roaming theatre with Ashirbad Theatre. He also acted in Rajmahal Theatre. The list of plays includes "Surongor Xekhot", a drama which was aired in the All India Radio in the 1980s, "Surjyo" and "Bhai".

Other interests

Compering and social causes

Kopil had compered for Axom Idol - a Musical Talent search program hosted in NE TV, Sur-Taal-Loy another Musical talent program impressively anchored by Kopil Bora in association with Barsha Rani Bishaya and Surajit Malakar Guwahati - and various News years eve celebrations hosted in DD NE and participated in the cultural extravaganza in the closing function of the 33rd National games, held at Guwahati.

Kopil Bora and Nishita Goswami, co-hosted the 3rd Darpan Mrs. India North East title, the highly coveted beauty pageant for married women in the North East, during a glittering function at the Pragjyotika ITA Centre auditorium for performing Arts.

In 2010, Kopil Bora provided the background narration for a 21-minute documentary film, Friends of Kaziranga, which pays tribute to the forest guards of the Kaziranga National Park.

Bora also inaugurated a clothes bank at a function held at Hotel Brahmaputra Ashok, Guwahati. The bank, which redistributes discarded clothes to the poor and needy, was launched by a city-based NGO, Xavier's Foundation, with the support of North Eastern Development Finance Corporation Limited (NEDFi), which is a financial and development institution formed under the DoNER ministry.

Endorsements
Kopil Bora is the brand ambassador of CEC - an educational trust based in Guwahati. He has also done modeling for different assignments.

Filmography

Assamese films

Bengali films

Music videos and television
Jan Oi Joubon Doi
Moromjaan (2007)
Ure Pakhi Meli
Ajanite Tumak
Moromi Priya
Rato Rani (Nepali)
Nargis (On the Assamese Muslim culture, by Biju Phukan)
Tora (produced by Nayan Nirban)
Rongpuror Nasonir Bihu
Niyoror Phool (Assamese serial)

References

External links
 
Kopil Bora on YouTube  

Assamese actors
Assamese-language actors
Living people
People from Kamrup Metropolitan district
Don Bosco schools alumni
Cotton College, Guwahati alumni
1977 births